The ankle jerk reflex, also known as the Achilles reflex, occurs when the Achilles tendon is tapped while the foot is dorsiflexed. 
It is a type of stretch reflex that tests the function of the gastrocnemius muscle and the nerve that supplies it.
A positive result would be the jerking of the foot towards its plantar surface. Being a deep tendon reflex, it is monosynaptic. It is also a stretch reflex. 
These are monosynaptic spinal segmental reflexes. When they are intact, integrity of the following is confirmed: cutaneous innervation, motor supply, and cortical input to the corresponding spinal segment.

Root value
This reflex is mediated by the S1 spinal segment of the spinal cord.

Procedure and components
Ankle of the patient is relaxed. It is helpful to support the ball of the foot at least somewhat to put some tension in the Achilles tendon, but don’t completely dorsiflex the ankle. A small strike is given on the Achilles tendon using a rubber hammer to elicit the response. If the practitioner is not able to elicit a response, a Jendrassik maneuver can be tried by having the patient cup their fingers on each hand and try to pull the hands apart. A positive response is marked by a brisk plantarflexion of the foot. The response is also graded into Grade 0-4 according to the reflex grading system.

Absent ankle jerk

The Achilles reflex checks if the S1 and S2 nerve roots are intact and could be indicative of sciatic nerve pathology. It is classically delayed in hypothyroidism. This reflex is usually absent in disk herniations at the L5—S1 level. A reduction in the ankle jerk reflex may also be indicative of peripheral neuropathy.

Common causes
Lumbar herniated disk syndrome
Lumbar spinal stenosis
Endocrine disorders
Hypothyroidism
Sciatic neuropathy
Lumbosacral plexus disorder
Amyotrophic lateral sclerosis
Cauda equina syndrome
Lumbar radiculopathy
Holmes-Adie syndrome
Idiopathic
Trauma
Concussion, spinal cord
Hypothermia
Infectious diseases
Tabes dorsalis
Poliomyelitis, acute
Lumbar disk infection/pyogenic
Arachnoiditis lumbosacral
Neoplastic disorders
Primary
Secondary
Allergic, collagen, autoimmune diseases
Diabetic neuropathy

Rarer causes
Abetalipoproteinemia
Electrolyte abnormalities
Hypokalemia
Deficiency disorders
Vitamin E deficiency
Congenital developmental disorders
Spina bifida
Genetic disorders
Hypokalemic periodic paralysis
Charcot–Marie–Tooth disease
Spinal muscular atrophy
Friedreich's ataxia
Drugs
Tubocurarine
Pyridoxine excess/megadose
Chronic alcoholism

Ankle clonus
Grade 4 ankle hyperreflexia is called ankle clonus. There is repetitive ankle dorsiflexion and plantarflexion on passive dorsiflexion of the foot by the examiner till the force applied by the examiner is withdrawn.

Causes
Any spinal cord lesions, be it traumatic, neoplastic, pyogenic, vascular above the level of S1 can cause clonus. This is because of the spasticity caused by the UMN type of injury causing hyperreflexia and clonus. Some other causes of clonus are
Meningitis
Tetanus
CJD
Cerebral palsy
Multiple sclerosis
Syringomyelia
Pre-eclampsia

See also
Tonic vibration reflex

References

Reflexes